Roraimaea is a genus of flowering plants belonging to the family Gentianaceae.

Its native range is Northern Brazil.

Species:

Roraimaea aurantiaca  – native to white sand savannas (Campinarana) in Roraima state of Brazil.
Roraimaea coccinea  – native to the Sierra de la Neblina of Venezuela.

References

Gentianaceae
Gentianaceae genera
Flora of the Tepuis